Put Your Money Where Your Mouth Is is an English language EP by the German punk band Die Toten Hosen. It was released to promote the English language album Love, Peace & Money. "Put Your Money Where Your Mouth Is" is also the title of a song from Love, Peace & Money (English version of "Kauf MICH!").

Track listing
 "Lovesong" (Breitkopf/Frege, Plain) − 3:41 (English version of "Liebeslied")
 "My Land" (Breitkopf/Frege, Dangerfield) − 3:55 ("Willkommen in Deutschland")
 "Whole Wide World" (Wreckless Eric) − 3:19 (Wreckless Eric cover)
 "Long Way from Liverpool" (Breitkopf, John Plain/Frege) - 3:01
 "Guantanamera" (Joséito Fernandez) - 3:20

Personnel
Campino - vocals
Andreas von Holst - guitar
Michael Breitkopf - guitar
Andreas Meurer - bass
Wolfgang Rohde - drums

1994 EPs
Die Toten Hosen EPs